A rapier is a slender, sharply pointed sword.

Rapier may also refer to:

Surname
An English variant of Roper (surname)

People  
 George M. Rapier III, a CEO and chairman
 James T. Rapier, a United States Representative from 1873 until 1875
 John L. Rapier, an American Civil War soldier and businessman

Fictional characters 
 Rapier (comics), a fictional character in the Marvel Comics universe

Objects  
 A device that is employed in a rapier loom
 Rapier (missile), a British surface-to-air missile
 Sunbeam Rapier, the first of the "Audax" range of light cars
 Napier Rapier, a British designed engine
 Lagonda Rapier, a small car
 Maersk Rapier, an oil tanker on permanent assignment to the UK Ministry of Defence
 North American XF-108 Rapier, a proposed long-range aircraft
 Hernandez Rapier 65, a homebuilt biplane